Tin Can Man may refer to:

 Tin Can Man (The Munsters), an episode of The Munsters
 Tin Can Man (film), a 2007 Irish horror film